Electrical busbar systems (sometimes simply referred to as busbar systems) are a modular approach to electrical wiring, where instead of a standard cable wiring to every single electrical device, the electrical devices are mounted onto an adapter which is directly fitted to a current carrying busbar. This modular approach is used in distribution boards, automation panels and other kinds of installation in an electrical enclosure.

Busbar systems are subject to safety standards for design and installation along with electrical enclosure according to IEC 61439-1 and vary between countries and regions.

Content & types of busbar systems 

A busbar system usually contains couple of busbar holders, busbars, Adapters to mount devices, clamps either with protective covering or without covering to powerup or distribute the current from the busbar system & busbar mountable electrical devices.

Electrical busbar systems can be differentiated by the distance between center of each busbar and vary according to maximum current carrying capacity of the system which depends on IEC standards. commonly known busbar system types.

 40 mm Busbar System (Current carrying capacity up to 300–400 Amps) 
 60 mm Busbar System (Current carrying capacity up to 800–2500 Amps)
 100 mm Busbar System (Current carrying capacity up to 1250 Amps)
 185 mm Busbar System (Current carrying capacity up to 2500 Amps)

Advantages and disadvantages over traditional electrical wiring

Advantage
 Electrically Safe installation up to IP 60 inside the cabinet,
 Drastically reduce space required inside the cabinet
 Easy trouble shooting in case of switch gear failure
 Pre-tested short circuit rating 
 Mounting of 2, 3, 4 or 5 pole switchgear in a single construction
 Time saving during construction of the cabinet

Disadvantages
 Commercially not viable if the number of switch gears is low
 Specialists needed for construction of the busbar system from a wiring diagram 
 Lack of adapters for mounting different electrical devices on the busbar
 Special type of busbars needed to construct busbar system which can carry current more than 800 Ampere

See also

10603 – a frequently used MIL-SPEC compliant wire
Bus duct
Cable Entry System
Cable gland
Cable management
Cable tray
Domestic AC power plugs and sockets
Electrical conduit
Electrical room
Electrical wiring in North America
Electrical wiring in the United Kingdom
Electricity distribution
Grounding
Home wiring
Industrial and multiphase power plugs and sockets
Neutral wire
OFHC
Portable cord
 Power cord
Restriction of Hazardous Substances Directive (RoHS)
Single-phase electric power
Structured cabling
Three-phase electric power

References

Electrical wiring